Basis database or OpenText Collections Server is an Extended Relational Database Management System (RDBMS) produced by OpenText.

BASIS was originally developed by the Battelle Institute, and was spun off into Information Dimensions, a private company based out of Columbus Ohio. The strength of BASIS was its Full Text Indexing. 

The original version of BASIS was eventually merged with an RDBMS system called DM, and the resulting product was called BASISplus. 

Information Dimensions was bought and sold a number of times before being acquired by OpenText Corporation in summer 1998. 

Although the product is an extremely powerful and robust Full Text Database that incorporates a number of interesting features such as an integrated Thesaurus, early SGML support and BLOB storage, it remains a very niche product which struggles to keep its market share. 

The product runs on multiple platforms, and has a number of programming interfaces, including ODBC and JDBC drivers.

External links
 OpenText Collections Server
 OpenText Collections Server Product Overview

References

Proprietary database management systems